The 1974 Major League Baseball season: The Oakland Athletics won their third consecutive World Series, defeating the Los Angeles Dodgers four games to one.

Two notable personal milestones were achieved during the 1974 season. The first came on April 8, when Hank Aaron of the Atlanta Braves blasted his 715th career home run, breaking the all-time career home run mark of 714 set by Babe Ruth. Aaron would finish his career with 755 home runs, a record that would stand until Barry Bonds broke it in 2007. The second milestone came on September 10, when the St. Louis Cardinals' Lou Brock stole his 105th base off pitcher Dick Ruthven and catcher Bob Boone of the Philadelphia Phillies. This broke the single-season stolen base record of 104, set by Maury Wills in 1962. Brock stole 118 bases for the season, a record that would stand until 1982, when Rickey Henderson stole 130.

Standings

American League

National League

Postseason

Bracket

Awards and honors
Baseball Hall of Fame
Cool Papa Bell
Jim Bottomley
Jocko Conlan
Whitey Ford
Mickey Mantle
Sam Thompson
Most Valuable Player
Jeff Burroughs, Texas Rangers (AL)
Steve Garvey, Los Angeles Dodgers (NL)
Cy Young Award
Catfish Hunter, Oakland Athletics (AL)
Mike Marshall, Los Angeles Dodgers (NL)
Rookie of the Year
Mike Hargrove, Texas Rangers (AL)
Bake McBride, St. Louis Cardinals (NL)
Gold Glove Award
George Scott (1B) (AL) 
Bobby Grich (2B) (AL) 
Brooks Robinson (3B) (AL) 
Mark Belanger (SS) (AL) 
Paul Blair (OF) (AL) 
Amos Otis (OF) (AL) 
Joe Rudi (OF) (AL)
Thurman Munson (C) (AL) 
Jim Kaat (P) (AL)

Statistical leaders

Home Field Attendance

Events
On August 30, Texas Rangers player Dave Nelson steals three bases – 2nd, 3rd and home in the first inning against the Cleveland Indians.

References

External links

1974 Major League Baseball season schedule at Baseball Reference
Baseball History Shorts

 
Major League Baseball seasons